The football tournament at the 2021 Southeast Asian Games was held from 6 to 22 May 2022 in Vietnam. In addition to the host city Hanoi, matches were held in Việt Trì, Nam Định and Cẩm Phả.

Associations affiliated with FIFA may send teams to participate in the tournament. There were no age restrictions on women's teams. For men's teams, with the postponement of the Games from 2021 to 2022 due to the COVID-19 pandemic, the age limit was raised from under-22 (set since 2017) to under-23 (born on or after 1 January 1999) with a maximum of three overage players allowed.

Competition schedule
The following is the competition schedule for the football competitions:

Venues
A total of 4 venues across 4 cities are used to host football matches. Mỹ Đình National Stadium hosted the Men's Bronze medal match and the Men's Gold medal Match.

Participating nations

Men's tournament

Group stage 
All times are Vietnam Standard Time (UTC+7).

Group A 
<onlyinclude>

Group B

Knockout stage

Winners

Women's tournament

Group stage 
All times are Vietnam Standard Time (UTC+7).

Group A

Group B

Knockout stage

Winners

Medal summary

Medal table

Medalists

References

Football at the 2021 Southeast Asian Games